Morning Undersea is a 1980 Portuguese drama film directed by Lauro António. It was entered into the 12th Moscow International Film Festival where it won a Special Diploma. The film was also selected as the Portuguese entry for the Best Foreign Language Film at the 53rd Academy Awards, but was not accepted as a nominee.

Cast
 Eunice Muñoz as Dona Estefânia
 Vergílio Ferreira as Reitor
 Canto e Castro as Padre Tomás
 Jacinto Ramos as Padre Martins
 Carlos Wallenstein as Padre Lino
 Joaquim Manuel Dias as António
 Miguel Franco as Capitão

See also
 List of submissions to the 53rd Academy Awards for Best Foreign Language Film
 List of Portuguese submissions for the Academy Award for Best Foreign Language Film

References

External links
 

1980 films
1980 drama films
Portuguese drama films
1980s Portuguese-language films
Films based on Portuguese novels